Meadow Independent School District is a public school district based in Meadow, Texas (USA).  The district is a single campus district with two schools, Burleson Elementary, serving Pre-K through 5th, and Meadow High School, which serves grades six through twelve.

In 2009, the school district was rated "academically acceptable" by the Texas Education Agency.

Special programs

Athletics
Meadow High School plays six-man football.

References

External links
Meadow ISD

School districts in Terry County, Texas